The Politics of Yongzhou in Hunan province in the People's Republic of China is structured in a dual party-government system like all other governing institutions in mainland China.

The Mayor of Yongzhou is the highest-ranking official in the People's Government of Yongzhou or Yongzhou Municipal Government. However, in the city's dual party-government governing system, the Mayor has less power than the Communist Party of Yongzhou Municipal Committee Secretary, colloquially termed the "CPC Party Chief of Yongzhou" or "Communist Party Secretary of Yongzhou".

List of mayors of Yongzhou

List of CPC Party secretaries of Yongzhou

References

Yongzhou
Yongzhou